Eggesbønes is a village that is located in the southern part of the town of Fosnavåg in the municipality of Herøy in Møre og Romsdal county, Norway. Located on the southern part of the island of Bergsøya, the industrial area of Eggesbønes features a fishing harbor, and the world's largest fish processing plant, which is operated by Marine Harvest.

The village area is located along the Herøyfjorden, just northeast of the Flåvær islands and the Flåvær Lighthouse.  The island of Gurskøya is located across the fjord.

References

Herøy, Møre og Romsdal
Sunnmøre
Populated places in Møre og Romsdal